William Hannington (by 1530 – 10 May 1607), of Dover and Hougham Court, Kent, was an English politician.

He was a Member of Parliament (MP) for Dover in November 1554.

References

Year of birth missing
16th-century births
1607 deaths
Members of the Parliament of England for Dover
English MPs 1554–1555